Ritchie Bodily (1 February 1918 – 13 November 1997) was a British philatelist and stamp dealer who was added to the Roll of Distinguished Philatelists in 1990.

Bodily formed an important collection of British illustrated envelopes and registered mail. He was an honorary member of the Royal Philatelic Society London.

Selected publications
British Pictorial Envelopes of the 19th Century. Collectors Club of Chicago, 1984.

References

Signatories to the Roll of Distinguished Philatelists
British philatelists
1918 births
1997 deaths
British stamp dealers